Andar ng mga Balita could refer to the following newscasts anchored by Martin Andanar:

Andar ng mga Balita (radio), a radio newscast
Andar ng mga Balita (TV newscast), a television newscast